The London, Midland and Scottish Railway (LMS) Karrier Ro-Railer was a British experimental road-rail (rail)bus built by Karrier in 1931. Its road registration was UR7924. Based on a Karrier Chaser bus with Cravens bodywork, it could run on the road on tyres or on standard gauge track. It had a 6-cylinder petrol engine.

Initially used on the Hemel Hemstead – Harpenden branch line, it was transferred to Stratford-on-Avon in 1932 for services from Stratford Old Town railway station to the Welcombe Hotel.  The front axle broke after only a few weeks service. Finally it became a vehicle used to transport track ballast on the West Highland Line.

See also 
 Railroad bus

References

External links 
 Article at Warwickshire Railways website
 SMJ Society

Experimental vehicles
Railcars of the United Kingdom
Buses by type
Rail and road vehicle